German submarine U-357 was a Type VIIC U-boat of Nazi Germany's Kriegsmarine during World War II and was sunk by British warships northwest of Ireland on 26 December 1942 on her first operational patrol.

Design
German Type VIIC submarines were preceded by the shorter Type VIIB submarines. U-357 had a displacement of  when at the surface and  while submerged. She had two shafts and two  propellers.

U-357 was fitted with five  torpedo tubes (four fitted at the bow and one at the stern), fourteen torpedoes, one  SK C/35 naval gun, 220 rounds, and a  C/30 anti-aircraft gun. The boat had a complement of between forty-four and sixty.

Service history
The submarine was laid down on 19 May 1940 at the Flensburger Schiffbau-Gesellschaft yard at Flensburg as yard number 476, launched on 31 March 1942 and commissioned on 18 June under the command of Kapitänleutnant Adolf Kellner.

She served with the 8th U-boat Flotilla from 18 June 1942 and the 6th flotilla from 1 December.

Fate

36 men died; six survived.

References

Bibliography

External links

German Type VIIC submarines
U-boats commissioned in 1942
U-boats sunk in 1942
U-boats sunk by British warships
U-boats sunk by depth charges
1942 ships
Ships built in Flensburg
World War II submarines of Germany
World War II shipwrecks in the Atlantic Ocean
Maritime incidents in December 1942